Xamtanga (also Agawinya, Khamtanga, Simt'anga, Xamir, Xamta) is a Central Cushitic language spoken in Ethiopia by the Xamir people.

Sound system

Vowels

The central vowels  have fronted and backed allophones, depending on the adjacent consonant(s).

Consonants

 is found only word-initial in loanwords, and may be glottal  or pharyngeal .
 is alveolar before the vowel , dental otherwise.
 can be ejective , and in some cases the ejectives appear to be in free variation with the voiceless plosives.

Phonological processes

Gemination
In positions other than word-initial, Xamtanga contrasts geminate and non-geminate consonants. Their geminate equivalents may be realized as prolonged , or can simply be short .

In word-initial position, geminate consonants do not occur, and /b t q/ are realized as plosives.

Notes

Bibliography

 Appleyard, David L. (1988) "A Definite Article in Xamtanga", African Languages and Cultures 1/1, pp. 15–24.
Appleyard, David L. (2006) A Comparative Dictionary of the Agaw Languages (Kuschitische Sprachstudien – Cushitic Language Studies Band 24). Köln: Rüdiger Köppe Verlag.
 Chloé Darmon, L'agäw xamtanga : une langue couchitique en contact avec l'amharique, In Pount. Cahiers d'études : Corne de l'Afrique - Arabie du Sud, 4, pp. 169–195, 2010

Languages of Ethiopia
Central Cushitic languages